Bochum is a city in North Rhine-Westphalia, Germany. Bochum may also refer to:

Places
 Bochum, Limpopo, a town in South Africa

Germany
 Bochum Observatory, a research institute in Bochum, Nordrhein-Westfalen, Germany.

Music
 4630 Bochum, studio album by Herbert Grönemeyer
 Bochum Welt, electronic musician
 Bochum Total, annual music festival in Bochum, Germany

Sports
TuS Bochum, Turn- und Sportverein Bochum 1908, was a German association football club from the city of Bochum, North Rhine-Westphalia
VfL Bochum, German association football club based in the city of Bochum, North Rhine-Westphalia